The Workers Communist League may refer to:

 The Workers Communist League (Gitlowites), a 1933 U.S. political group
 The Workers' Communist League (New Zealand), a 1980 New Zealand splinter offshoot of the Communist Party of New Zealand.

See also
 Communist Workers League (disambiguation)